The Directorate General for Public Security ("GDföS") is the governing body of general law enforcement in Austria and a division of the Ministry of the Interior. It oversees the Federal Police, the Criminal Intelligence Service, the Intelligence Directorate, the EKO Cobra, and the Aerial Police.

The Directorate General is headquartered in the Palais Modena, Vienna.

History 

The Directorate General was first established in 1930 as a division of the Chancellery. After the annexation of Austria into Nazi Germany, Heinrich Himmler ordered the organization's dissolution. Directorate General was restored following the end of Nazi rule, but did not gain back control of most police forces until

Ensuing the Ibiza affair in 2019, Interior Minister Herbert Kickl moved to appoint Peter Goldgruber, with whom he had close ties, Director General on 20 May. The affair marked the likely collapse of the Cabinet and as the Director General is a career civil servant position that transcends political leadership changes, appointing Goldgruber would have allowed Kickl and his party to retain control over law enforcement while no longer being in power themselves. However, Goldgruber's appointment required presidential confirmation (otherwise he would only hold the position's powers and duties but not the position itself) but President Van der Bellen declined to approve the appointment. On 22 May, Van der Bellen removed Kickl from office on the request of Chancellor Sebastian Kurz and Kickl's successor Eckart Ratz dismissed Goldgruber a few days later.

Agencies

Federal Police 
The Federal Police is the primary civilian law enforcement agency of Austria, responsible for ordinary policing and border control. It succeeded the Gendarmerie, the Guard Corps, the Detective Corps, and the urban police forces in 2005.

The Federal Police is not an actual government authority, but the aggregate of various geographically based police forces. It is organised into nine police directorates, one for each state, and a dozen autonomous police units. Police commands serve as the elementary divisions of the Federal Police and operate on municipality or precinct level; they either report to one of the nine police directorates or to a precinct authority. The police commands of Vienna, the state capitals, and the other major urban centers are subject to the operational direction of the police directorates, while most rural area police commands serve under precinct authorities. The police directorates are headed by commissioners who report directly to the minister of the interior.

EKO Cobra 
The Cobra Special Operations Command, abbreviated EKO Cobra, is the main police tactical unit of Austria.

It is responsible for hostage situations, highly dangerous criminal apprehensions, organized crime, counterterrorism, the protection of high-profile politicians, and providing air marshals for commercial flights.

Intelligence Directorate 
The Intelligence Directorate, officially the Directorate of State Security and Intelligence (DSN) is the primary civilian security agency of Austria.

Established on December 1, 2021, in order to replace the old BVT service. It is led by Omar Haijawi-Pirchner.

History 
The decision to create the DSN came after the BVT, the predecessor intelligence agency, failed to prevent the 2020 Vienna attack, despite numerous warnings and surveillance information.

The current director of the DSN is Omar Haijawi-Pirchner, an Austrian police officer of Jordanian descent.

Criminal Investigative Office 

The Criminal Investigative Office is a specialized police agency that investigates certain types of crime. It has nationwide criminal operations jurisdiction and about 900 employees. It also serves as the national bureau for Europol and the Schengen Information System as well as a regional outpost for Interpol.

Aerial Police 
The Aerial Police is a complementary law enforcement agency that conducts airborne operations to support the Federal Police with criminal matters, major events, and traffic control. It also assists fire fighters when needed and carries out search and rescue missions for the Civil Aviation Authority. The Aerial Police is also in close cooperation with the European border agency Frontex.

References

External links 
  Website of the Generaldirektion für die öffentliche Sicherheit on the website of the Federal Ministry of the Interior.
  Badges and insignia of the General Director for Public Security

Law enforcement agencies of Austria
Anti–child pornography organizations